Wegert Bluff is a bluff, the northeast extremity of a truncated ridge that overlooks the east margin of Noll Glacier in the Wilson Hills. Mapped by United States Geological Survey (USGS) from surveys and U.S. Navy air photos, 1960–63. Named by Advisory Committee on Antarctic Names (US-ACAN) for Lieutenant Commander Sidney J. Wegert, U.S. Navy, pilot in LC-130F Hercules aircraft during Operation Deep Freeze 1967 and 1968.

Cliffs of Oates Land